Angela H. Rosenthal (12 September 1963-11 November 2010) was an art historian at Dartmouth College and an expert on the art of Angelica Kauffman. Her masterwork was Angelica Kauffman: Art and sensibility, published by Yale University Press in 2006 which won the Historians of British Art Book Award in the pre-1800 category in 2007.

Early life and family
Angela Rosenthal was born in Trier, Germany, to Peter and Anne Rosenthal. She had a sister, Felicia Rosenthal, who also became a professor. Rosenthal attended the University of Trier. She married Adrian Randolph, also an art historian and professor at Dartmouth College.

Career
Rosenthal taught at the Staatsgalerie Saarbrucken and at Northwestern University before joining Dartmouth College in 1997 where she was an associate professor of art history. She edited a book of essays on William Hogarth and was an expert on the Austrian painter Angelica Kauffman about whom she produced several books, including her authoritative Angelica Kauffman: Art and sensibility that was published by Yale University Press in association with the Paul Mellon Centre for Studies in British Art in 2006. In 2007, that book won the Historians of British Art Book Award in the pre-1800 category.

Rosenthal also had an interest in the visual depiction of race and humour. In 2013, a book that Rosenthal had been editing at the time of her death with Agnes Lugo-Ortiz on slave portraits in the Atlantic world was published, and in 2015, an edited work on humour in the visual arts was completed by her husband Adrian Randolph and published by the Dartmouth College Press.

Death
Rosenthal died from cancer at Dartmouth on 11 November 2010.

Selected publications
"Angelica Kauffman Ma(s)king Claims", Art History, March 1992, Vol. 15, Issue 1, pp 38-59.  
"Kauffman and portraiture", in Angelica Kauffman: A continental Artist in Georgian England, ed. by Wendy Wassyng Roworth. London, Reaktion Books, 1992. pp. 96-111. 
Angelika Kauffmann: Bildnismalerei im 18. Jahrhundert. Reimer, 1996. (German language) 
The other Hogarth: Aesthetics of difference. Princeton University Press, Princeton, 2001. (Edited with Bernadette Fort) 
Angelica Kauffman: Art and sensibility. Yale University Press in association with the Paul Mellon Centre for Studies in British Art, New Haven, 2006. 
Angelica Kauffman in British collections: An exhibition to commemorate the 200th anniversary of her death/[with] an essay by Angela Rosenthal: Recollecting Kauffman. Rafael Valls, London, 2007.
Slave portraiture in the Atlantic world. Cambridge University Press, Cambridge, 2013. (Edited with Agnes Lugo-Ortiz) 
No laughing matter: Visual humor in ideas of race, nationality, and ethnicity. Dartmouth College Press, Lebanon, New Hampshire, 2015. (Edited with David Bindman and Adrian W.B. Randolph)

See also
Bettina Baumgärtel

References 

1963 births
2010 deaths
German art historians
People from Trier
Dartmouth College faculty
German women academics
Deaths from cancer in New Hampshire
University of Trier alumni
Angelica Kauffman
Northwestern University faculty
German women historians